The following is a list of Intel Core i9 brand microprocessors. They were introduced in May 2017 for LGA 2066 chips, also known as Intel Core X-series processors. With their high number of cores, high power draw, high thermal output, and high performance, they are intended to be used by enthusiasts. A mobile version based on the standard BGA1440 socket was released in 2018, featuring six hyperthreaded cores and 12 MB of cache. It has been proven to be able to attain 5 GHz under ideal conditions.

The Core i9 brand was expanded to incorporate mainstream processors in October 2018, following the release of the Core i9-9900K processor, which uses Intel's mainstream consumer platform.

Desktop processors

Skylake-X (14 nm, 7th generation) 
 
 All models support: MMX, SSE, SSE2, SSE3, SSSE3, SSE4.1, SSE4.2, AVX, AVX2, AVX-512, FMA3, MPX, Enhanced Intel SpeedStep Technology (EIST), Intel 64, XD bit (an NX bit implementation), Intel VT-x, Intel VT-d, Turbo Boost, Hyper-threading, AES-NI, Intel TSX-NI, Smart Cache.
 PCI Express lanes: 44
 Memory type: DDR4-2666
 Max memory channels: 4
 Max Memory Bandwidth: 85 GB/s

Coffee Lake-S (14 nm, 9th generation) 
 All models support: MMX, SSE, SSE2, SSE3, SSSE3, SSE4.1, SSE4.2, AVX, AVX2, FMA3, SGX, MPX, Enhanced Intel SpeedStep Technology (EIST), Intel 64, XD bit (an NX bit implementation), Intel VT-x, Intel VT-d, Turbo Boost, Hyper-threading, AES-NI, Intel TSX-NI, Intel vPro (except 9900KF, 9900KS), Intel TXT (except 9900KS), Smart Cache.
 Overclocking: Unlocked multiplier on K, KF, and KS models
 i9-9900 additionally supports Intel Thermal Velocity Boost
 PCI Express lanes: 16
 Memory type: DDR4-2666
 Max memory channels: 2
 Max Memory Bandwidth: 41.6 GB/s

Cascade Lake-X (14 nm, enthusiast) 
 Cascade Lake-X (Enthusiast) microarchitecture, which has no official "generation designation" by Intel, but fits between 9th and 10th generations by timeline.
 All models support: MMX, SSE, SSE2, SSE3, SSSE3, SSE4.1, SSE4.2, AVX, AVX2, AVX-512, FMA3, Enhanced Intel SpeedStep Technology (EIST), Intel 64, XD bit (an NX bit implementation), Intel VT-x, Intel VT-d, Turbo Boost, Hyper-threading, AES-NI, Intel TSX-NI, Smart Cache, DL Boost.
 PCI Express lanes: 48
 Supports up to 8 DIMMs of DDR4 memory, maximum 256 GB
 Memory type: DDR4-2933
 Max memory channels: 4
 Max Memory Bandwidth: 94 GB/s

Comet Lake-S (14 nm, 10th generation) 

 All models support: MMX, SSE, SSE2, SSE3, SSSE3, SSE4.1, SSE4.2, AVX, AVX2, FMA3, SGX, Enhanced Intel SpeedStep Technology (EIST), Intel 64, XD bit (an NX bit implementation), Intel VT-x, Intel VT-d, Turbo Boost 3.0, Thermal Velocity Boost, Hyper-threading, AES-NI, Smart Cache.
 Low power and K models also support configurable TDP (cTDP) down
 Non-F models also support Intel vPro
 Overclocking: Unlocked multiplier on K and KF models
 Embedded and low power models do not support Thermal Velocity Boost
 Memory type: DDR4-2933
 Max Memory Size: 128 GB
 Max memory channels: 2
 Max Memory Bandwidth: 45.8 GB/s

Rocket Lake-S (14 nm, 11th generation) 
 All models support: SSE4.1, SSE4.2, AVX, AVX2, AVX-512, FMA3, Enhanced Intel SpeedStep Technology (EIST), Intel 64, XD bit (an NX bit implementation), Intel VT-x, Intel VT-d, Hyper-threading, Turbo Boost 3.0, Intel TXT, Thermal Velocity Boost, AES-NI, Smart Cache, DL Boost.
 Low power and K models also support configurable TDP (cTDP) down
 Overclocking: Unlocked multiplier and Adaptive Boost Technology on K and KF models
 Embedded and low power models do not support Thermal Velocity Boost
 All models support up to DDR4-3200 memory, and 20 lanes of PCI Express 4.0.
 Max Memory Size: 128 GB
 Max memory channels: 2
 Max Memory Bandwidth: 50 GB/s

Alder Lake (Intel 7, 12th generation) 
 All models support: SSE4.1, SSE4.2, AVX, AVX2, FMA3, Enhanced Intel SpeedStep Technology (EIST), Intel 64, XD bit (an NX bit implementation), Intel VT-x, Intel VT-d, Hyper-threading, Turbo Boost 3.0 (2.0 for embedded), AES-NI, Smart Cache, Thread Director, DL Boost, GNA 3.0, and Optane memory.
 12900KS also supports Thermal Velocity Boost.
 All models support up to DDR5-4800 or DDR4-3200 memory, and 16 lanes of PCI Express 5.0 + 4 lanes of PCIe 4.0.
 Overclocking: Unlocked multiplier on K and KF models.

Raptor Lake (Intel 7, 13th generation) 
 All models support: SSE4.1, SSE4.2, AVX, AVX2, FMA3, Enhanced Intel SpeedStep Technology (EIST), Intel 64, XD bit (an NX bit implementation), Intel VT-x, Intel VT-d, Hyper-threading, Turbo Boost 3.0, Thermal Velocity Boost, AES-NI, Smart Cache, Thread Director, DL Boost, and GNA 3.0.

 All models support up to DDR5-5600 or DDR4-3200 memory, and 16 lanes of PCI Express 5.0 + 4 lanes of PCIe 4.0.
 Overclocking: Unlocked multiplier on K and KF models.

 Mobile processors 

 Coffee Lake-H (14 nm, 8th generation) 
 No support for AVX-512 Overclocking: unlocked multiplier on HK models; locked multiplier on H models.
 Supports Intel processors with Thermal Velocity Boost.

 Comet Lake-H (14 nm, 10th generation) 
 No support for AVX-512 i9-10885H also supports Intel vPro, Intel TXT.
 i9-10885H supports cTDP down to 35 W; 19-10980HK supports cTDP up to 65 W.

 Tiger Lake-H (10 nm SuperFin, 11th generation) 
 All models support: SSE4.1, SSE4.2, AVX2, AVX-512, FMA3, Speed Shift Technology (SST), Intel 64, Intel VT-x, Intel VT-d, Turbo Boost, Hyper-threading, AES-NI, Smart Cache, DL Boost, Optane memory, GNA 2.0, IPU6, TB4, and configurable TDP (cTDP).

 Alder Lake (Intel 7, 12th generation) 

 Alder Lake-H 
 All models support: SSE4.1, SSE4.2, AVX, AVX2, FMA3, Speed Shift Technology (SST), Intel 64, XD bit (an NX bit implementation), Intel VT-x, Intel VT-d, Hyper-threading, Turbo Boost 3.0, AES-NI, Smart Cache, Thread Director, DL Boost, and GNA 3.0.
 All models support up to DDR5-4800, LPDDR5-5200, DDR4-3200, or LPDDR4X-4266 memory, and 28 lanes of PCI Express 4.0/3.0.
 Overclocking: unlocked multiplier on HK models; locked multiplier on H models.

 Alder Lake-HX 
 All models support: SSE4.1, SSE4.2, AVX, AVX2, FMA3, Speed Shift Technology (SST), Intel 64, XD bit (an NX bit implementation), Intel VT-x, Intel VT-d, Hyper-threading, Turbo Boost 3.0, AES-NI, Smart Cache, Thread Director, DL Boost, and GNA 3.0.
 All models support up to DDR5-4800 or DDR4-3200 memory, and 20 lanes of PCI Express 5.0/4.0.
 12950HX also supports Intel vPro, Intel TXT, and ECC memory.
 Overclocking: partial on i9-12950HX, full on i9-12900HX.

 Raptor Lake (Intel 7, 13th generation) 

 Raptor Lake-H 

 All models support: SSE4.1, SSE4.2, AVX, AVX2, FMA3, Speed Shift Technology (SST), Intel 64, XD bit (an NX bit implementation), Intel VT-x, Intel VT-d, Intel TXT, Hyper-threading, Turbo Boost 3.0, AES-NI, Smart Cache, Thread Director, DL Boost, and GNA 3.0.
 All models support up to DDR5-5200, LPDDR5-6400, DDR4-3200, or LPDDR4X-4266 memory, up to 16 lanes of PCI Express 5.0, and up to 4 lanes of PCI Express 4.0.
 Overclocking: unlocked multiplier on HK models; locked multiplier on H models.
 13900H/HK also support Intel vPro.

 Raptor Lake-PX 

 All models support: SSE4.1, SSE4.2, AVX, AVX2, FMA3, Speed Shift Technology (SST), Intel 64, XD bit (an NX bit implementation), Intel VT-x, Intel VT-d, Intel TXT, Hyper-threading, Turbo Boost 3.0, AES-NI, Smart Cache, Thread Director, DL Boost, and GNA 3.0.
 All models support up to DDR5-5200, LPDDR5-6400, DDR4-3200, or LPDDR4X-4266 memory, up to 16 lanes of PCI Express 5.0, and up to 4 lanes of PCI Express 4.0.

 Raptor Lake-HX 

 All models support: SSE4.1, SSE4.2, AVX, AVX2, FMA3, Speed Shift Technology (SST), Intel 64, XD bit (an NX bit implementation), Intel VT-x, Intel VT-d, Hyper-threading, Turbo Boost 3.0, AES-NI, Smart Cache, Thread Director, DL Boost, and GNA 3.0.
 All models support up to DDR5-5600, or DDR4-3200 memory, up to 16 lanes of PCI Express 5.0, and up to 4 lanes of PCI Express 4.0.
 All models support CPU, GPU, and memory overclocking.
 13950HX also supports Intel vPro'' and ECC memory.

See also 
 Intel Core
 List of Intel Celeron microprocessors
 List of Intel Pentium microprocessors
 List of Intel Core i3 microprocessors
 List of Intel Core i5 microprocessors
 List of Intel Core i7 microprocessors
Alder Lake (microprocessor)

Notes

References

External links 
 Search MDDS Database
 Intel ARK Database
 Intel Corporation – Processor Price List
 Intel CPU Transition Roadmap 2008–2013
 Intel Desktop CPU Roadmap 2004–2011
 Intel Core X-series processors

Core i9
Intel Core i9